Aaron Rainford Evans-Harriott (born 17, September 2002) is an English professional footballer who plays as a midfielder for EFL Championship  club Coventry City. Born in England, Evans-Harriott has represented Wales at youth level.

Education 
Evans-Harriott studied at The De Montfort School until 2019.

Career
Aaron Evans-Harriott started his career at Cheltenham Town and became the youngest player to represent the club since first joining the Football League, appearing 4–3 EFL Trophy win against West Ham United Under-21s on 8 October 2019.

On 28 February 2020 Cheltenham Town agreed a transfer with Coventry City for a compensation package.

International career
Aaron Evans-Harriott is half-Welsh and has represented Wales at under-15 level.

Personal life 
Aaron Evans-Harriott grew up in Evesham with his parents and sister. He moved to Coventry in February 2020. From a young age, Evans-Harriott knew that he wanted to become a footballer.

Career statistics

References

English footballers
Cheltenham Town F.C. players
Coventry City F.C. players
Association football midfielders
2002 births
Living people